Valeriy Alekseevitch Medvedtsev (born 5 July 1964) is a former Russian biathlete.

Career
On 16 January 1986, Medvedtsev achieved the feat of winning his World Cup debut.
He trained at the Armed Forces sports society in Izhevsk. At the 1988 Olympics in Calgary, Medvedtsev, competing for the USSR, won two silver medals in the 10 km sprint and the 20 km individual, and also gold medal in the relay. At the 1992 Olympics in Albertville he won a silver medal in the relay competition for the Unified Team. In the World Championships, Medvedtsev has three relay medals gold from 1986 in Oslo, silver from 1987 in Lake Placid and silver from 1993 in Borovets. And he also has two individual gold medals from the World Championships, gold medals in the 20 km from 1986 in Oslo (Holmenkollen ski festival biathlon) and 1990 in Minsk. He also has one gold medal from the 10 km from 1986 in Oslo (Holmenkollen ski festival biathlon).

Biathlon results
All results are sourced from the International Biathlon Union.

Olympic Games
4 medals (1 gold, 3 silver)

World Championships
7 medals (4 gold, 2 silver, 1 bronze)

*During Olympic seasons competitions are only held for those events not included in the Olympic program.
**Team was added as an event in 1989.

Individual victories
6 victories (5 In, 1 Sp)

*Results are from UIPMB and IBU races which include the Biathlon World Cup, Biathlon World Championships and the Winter Olympic Games.

References

External links
 
 
 

1964 births
Living people
Sportspeople from Izhevsk
Soviet male biathletes
Russian male biathletes
Biathletes at the 1988 Winter Olympics
Biathletes at the 1992 Winter Olympics
Biathletes at the 1994 Winter Olympics
Olympic biathletes of the Soviet Union
Olympic biathletes of the Unified Team
Olympic biathletes of Russia
Medalists at the 1988 Winter Olympics
Medalists at the 1992 Winter Olympics
Olympic medalists in biathlon
Olympic silver medalists for the Soviet Union
Olympic silver medalists for the Unified Team
Olympic gold medalists for the Soviet Union
Biathlon World Championships medalists
Holmenkollen Ski Festival winners